Christopher Stasheff (15 January 1944 – 10 June 2018) was an American science-fiction and fantasy author whose novels include The Warlock in Spite of Himself (1969) and Her Majesty's Wizard (1986). He received a bachelor's degree and a master of arts in radio-TV at the University of Michigan and a PhD in theater from the University of Nebraska. From 1972 to 1987, he taught at Montclair State College, then moved to Champaign, Illinois, and became a full-time writer. In 2000, he resumed teaching radio and television, at Eastern New Mexico University in Portales, New Mexico. He retired in 2009 and moved back to Champaign.  Chris died on June 10, 2018, from Parkinson's disease. Stasheff has been noted for his blending of science fiction and fantasy, as seen in his Warlock series, which placed an epic fantasy' in a science-fictional frame". Stasheff's writing is often seen in the moral and ethical mentor style similar to Terry Goodkind, Terry Brooks, or J. R. R. Tolkien.

Books

The DDT future continuity
 Saint Vidicon to the Rescue (2005)
 Escape Velocity (1983)
 Mind Out of Time (2003) (Short story collection)

Starship Troupers
 A Company of Stars (1991)
 We Open on Venus (1993)
 A Slight Detour (1994)
 The Unknown Guest (2012) (self published)

Warlock of Gramayre
 The Warlock in Spite of Himself (1969)
 King Kobold (1971, revised as King Kobold Revived (1984))
 The Warlock Unlocked (1982)
 The Warlock Enraged (1985)
 The Warlock Wandering (1986)
 The Warlock Is Missing (1986)
 The Warlock Heretical (1987)
 The Warlock's Companion (1988)
 The Warlock Insane (1989)
 The Warlock Rock (1990)
 Warlock and Son (1991)
 The Warlock's Last Ride (2004)

Ominbus editions:
 To the Magic Born (1986): Escape Velocity, The Warlock in Spite of Himself
 Odd Warlock Out (1989): The Warlock Heretical, The Warlock's Companion, The Warlock Insane
 Warlock: To the Magic Born (1990): Escape Velocity, The Warlock in Spite of Himself, King Kobold Revived
 The Warlock Enlarged (1991):King Kobold Revived, The Warlock Unlocked, The Warlock Enraged
 The Warlock's Night Out (1991): The Warlock Wandering, The Warlock is Missing

Rogue Wizard
 A Wizard in Bedlam (1979)
 A Wizard in Absentia (1993)
 A Wizard in Mind (1995)
 A Wizard in War (1995)
 A Wizard in Peace (1996)
 A Wizard in Chaos (1997)
 A Wizard in Midgard [pre-publication title A Wizard in Elfland] (1998)
 A Wizard and a Warlord (2000)
 A Wizard in the Way (2000)
 A Wizard in a Feud (2001)

The Warlock's Heirs
 M'lady Witch (1994)
 Quicksilver's Knight (1995)
 The Spell-bound Scholar (1999)
 Here Be Monsters (2001)

A Wizard in Rhyme
 Her Majesty's Wizard (1986)
 The Oathbound Wizard (1993)
 The Witch Doctor (1994)
 The Secular Wizard (1995)
 My Son, the Wizard (1997)
 The Haunted Wizard (1999)
 The Crusading Wizard (2000)
 The Feline Wizard (2000)

Star Stone
 The Shaman (1995)
 The Sage (1996)

Crafters
 The Crafters (1991) (with Bill Fawcett)
 Blessings and Curses (1992)

Harold Shea (with L. Sprague de Camp)
 The Enchanter Reborn (1992)
 The Exotic Enchanter (1995)

Mage Knight
 Stolen Prophecy (2003)

Other novels
 War and Honor (with Gordon R. Dickson, David Drake and Chelsea Quinn Yarbro)
 Wing Commander: End Run (with William R. Forstchen) (1994)

Standalone collections
 The Gods of War (1992)
 Dragon's Eye (1994)
 The Day the Magic Stopped (with Bill Fawcett) (1995)

Anthologies
 Blood and War (1993)

References

External links

  Official website
 Bibliography at Fantastic Fiction
 

1944 births
2018 deaths
20th-century American male writers
20th-century American novelists
21st-century American male writers
21st-century American novelists
American fantasy writers
American male novelists
American science fiction writers
Deaths from Parkinson's disease
Eastern New Mexico University faculty
Neurological disease deaths in Illinois
People from Mount Vernon, New York